Margaret Owen may refer to:
Margaret Owen (actress), American burlesque actress and decoy
Margaret Owen (plantswoman) (née Mackay 1930–2014), expert in snowdrops 
Margaret Lloyd George (née Owen, 1864–1941), wife of David Lloyd George
Margaret Ursula Jones (née Owen, 1916–2001), British archaeologist
Margaret Owen, author of The Merciful Crow